Høgni Karsten Hoydal (born 28 March 1966), commonly called Høgni Hoydal, is a Faroese politician. He currently serves as Deputy Prime Minister of the Faroe Islands and Minister of Foreign Affairs and Trade. He has been the party leader of Tjóðveldi since 1998.

Before taking office 
Høgni Hoydal was a reporter of the Faroese national television station, Kringvarp Føroya, for some years prior to his election to the Faroese parliament in 1998.

Political career 
Høgni Hoydal brought the Republican Party back up from four MPs to eight in the 1998 elections and into government, due to popular opinion at the time. Høgni Hoydal became Minister of Justice and deputy Prime Minister.

The coalition stayed in power after the parliamentary elections in 2002 and brought one more political party into the coalition and government. This coalition, however, broke down on 5 December 2003 and new elections held. After these elections another coalition was formed leaving the Republican Party in opposition.

In 2008, Hoydal assumed the position of Minister of Foreign Affairs. The government coalition between the Republican Party, the People's Party and the Independence Party agreed on a road map towards independence and initiated negotiations with the Government of Denmark. The negotiations, however, broke down and the Faroese coalition started going on a path towards greater autonomy by taking over the responsibility of matters previously undertaken by Denmark.

 Member of Republican Party
 1998 member of the Faroese parliament (Løgting)
 16 May 1998 to 5 September 2003 Minister of Justice and deputy Prime Minister
 5 February to 15 September 2008 Minister of Foreign Affairs in the Second Cabinet of Jóannes Eidesgaard
 2001 – 2011 Member of Danish parliament (Folketing) except for the periods when he was Minister
 2015 – Minister of Fisheries

Member of the Folketing 
In 2001, he was elected as one of the two Faroese members of the Danish Folketing. He was re-elected in 2005 and re-elected again in 2007; but in the 2011 election lost the party's only Folketing seat to the Social Democrats' Sjúrður Skaale.

Bibliography 
 Håb i krise, written together with Michael Haldrup, 1995 (Danish)
 Frælsi er Ábyrgd, 2000 (Faroese)
 Myten om rigsfællesskabet, 2000 (Danish)

The Hoydal family 
The family name Hoydal takes name after a neighbourhood in Tórshavn named Hoydalar, it is in a valley near Hoyvík. Dánjal Hoydal was the first who took the name, he was Høgni Hoydal's great-grandfather, he was born Joensen. His son was the Faroese writer and politician Karsten Hoydal (1912–1990) who was born in Hoydalar. Karsten Hoydal and his wife Marie Louise Falk-Rønne have four children: Annika Hoydal, born 1945, is an actor and singer, Gunnar Hoydal, born 1941 is also a writer, Kjartan Hoydal, born 1941 (Gunnar and Kjartan are twins) was secretary of the North East Atlantic Fisheries Commission (NEAFC) and is now director of sp/f Skrivarastova Fish and Film. They have another son called Egil. Høgni Hoydal is Kjartan Hoydal's son.

References

External links

 Løgtingið og høvundarnir 2: Løgtingið 150 (1st ed.) p. 288. Tórshavn Løgtingið 2002.
 The North Atlantic Group in the Danish Parliament
 Co-Creator of current Faro Whaling policy

1966 births
Living people
Republic (Faroe Islands) politicians
Members of the Løgting
Government ministers of the Faroe Islands
Foreign Ministers of the Faroe Islands
Deputy Prime Ministers of the Faroe Islands
Faroese writers
Fisheries Ministers of the Faroe Islands
Members of the Folketing 2001–2005
Members of the Folketing 2005–2007
Members of the Folketing 2007–2011
Members of the Folketing 2015–2019